Sugar Creek is a stream in Boone and Randolph Counties in the U.S. state of Missouri. It is a tributary of Perche Creek.

Sugar Creek was named for the sugar maple timber along its course.

See also
List of rivers of Missouri

References

Rivers of Boone County, Missouri
Rivers of Randolph County, Missouri
Rivers of Missouri